Anthony McCreath (born 24 July 1070) is a retired Jamaican association football midfielder who played professionally in the United States and earned five caps with the Jamaica national football team.

Club
In 1994, McCreath signed with the Colorado Foxes of the American Professional Soccer League.  He was a 1996 First Team All League midfielder with the Foxes.  In 1998, McCreath moved to the Hampton Roads Mariners of the USISL A-League.  After two seasons with the Mariners, he played four games for the Long Island Rough Riders in 2000.

International
In 1996, McCreath earned five caps with the Jamaica national football team, all in World Cup qualifiers.

References

External links

 

Living people
1970 births
American Professional Soccer League players
Colorado Foxes players
Virginia Beach Mariners players
Jamaican footballers
Jamaica international footballers
Jamaican expatriate footballers
Long Island Rough Riders players
Association football midfielders